Kutejnikov was the name of noble family of Don Cossacks origin. The most famous member of the family Dmitri Kutejnikov (1766 - 1844), born of Don Voisko Staff Officers kids. Was a Russian Full General of Cavalry in time of Napoleonic Wars. Hero of Battle of Kinburn (1787). Kuteinikov served in wars against France and Turkey, was in a Russian expedition to India in 1800. In Patriotic War of 1812 was at battles of Borodino, Maloyaroslavets and Berezina.

External links
 Shumkov, A.A., Ryklis, I.G. List of noble families of the Don Cossacks in alphabetical order. VIRD Publ House, Sankt-Peterburg. 2000, 

Don Cossacks noble families
Russian noble families